Andreas Franz Scheuer (born 26 September 1974) is a German politician of the Christian Social Union (CSU) party. From 2018 to 2021, he was Federal Minister of Transport and Digital Infrastructure in the Cabinet Merkel IV. From 2013 to 2018, he was Secretary General of the CSU. From 2009 to 2013, he was Parliamentary Secretary of State in the former Federal Ministry for Transport, Building and Urban Development in the Cabinet Merkel II. He has been a member of the German Bundestag since 2002. In 2016, he was also elected district chairman of CSU Lower Bavaria.

Early life and education 
Scheuer was born in Passau and completed high school there in 1994. In 1998, he completed his first state examination in teaching at junior high schools. Afterwards, he achieved a master's degree in political science, economics, and sociology at the University of Passau in 2001. In 2004, he completed a PhDr at Charles University Prague.

Political career

Career in state politics 
Scheuer has been a member of the CSU and the Junge Union (JU) since 1994. From 1997 to 2003, he was district chairman of the Junge Union Passau City. Between 1998 and 1999, he worked as adviser to Minister-President Edmund Stoiber of Bavaria.

Career in national politics 
From 1999 to 2001, Scheuer served on the JU's national board. From 2001 to 2003 he was a member of the JU board in the state of Bavaria. In 2001, Scheuer was also elected to the CSU district executive Lower Bavaria, from 2003 to 2007 he was district chairman of JU Lower Bavaria. In the 2003 election he joined the CSU district board of Passau City. From 1998 to 1999, he was an employee of Bavarian Minister President Edmund Stoiber. In 2002, he was also elected to the Passau city council.

Member of the German Parliament, 2002–present 
In 2009, Scheuer initiated a cross-party group for the protection of antique cars.

In the negotiations to form a Grand Coalition of Chancellor Angela Merkel's Christian Democrats (CDU together with the Bavarian CSU) and the Social Democrats (SPD) following the 2013 federal elections, Scheuer was part of the SPD delegation in the working group on transport, building and infrastructure, led by Peter Ramsauer and Florian Pronold.

In 2020, the Bundestag launched an inquiry about the minister implication in autobahn toll affairs. The opposition parties in the Bundestag accuses Scheuer of breaking the law and making massive mistakes. Scheuer's ministry is said to have broken budgetary and public procurement law when concluding the multi-billion dollar contracts with the operators and "deliberately deceived" the Bundestag about the real costs of the car toll.

Since the 2021 elections, Scheuer has been serving on the Committee on European Affairs.

Other activities

Corporate boards 
 KfW, Ex-Officio Member of the Board of Supervisory Directors (2018–2021)
 Klinik Prof. Schedel GmbH, Member of the Advisory Board

Non-profit organizations 
 Akademie für Politische Bildung Tutzing, Member of the Advisory Board
 German Deutsch-Tschechische und -Slowakische Gesellschaft (DTSG), Chairman
 Frischluft, Member of the Board of Trustees

In addition, Scheuer is a member of the broadcasting council of the German ZDF public television channel for the CSU party. In 2016 he demanded a "political aftermath" within the council because of the late reporting of the channel about the New Year's Eve sexual assaults in Germany.

Political positions 
In June 2017, Scheuer voted against Germany's introduction of same-sex marriage.

Personal life 
Scheuer was married to his first wife until 2011. He was later married to TV presenter Sabine Reisp from 2013 until 2018; the couple has a daughter. In August 2021 he married his girlfriend Julia Reuss.

References

External links 
Andreas Scheuer at the German Bundestag

1974 births
Living people
Members of the Bundestag for Bavaria
People from Passau
Charles University alumni
University of Passau alumni
Transport ministers of Germany
Communications ministers
Members of the Bundestag 2021–2025
Members of the Bundestag 2017–2021
Members of the Bundestag 2013–2017
Members of the Bundestag 2009–2013
Members of the Bundestag 2005–2009
Members of the Bundestag 2002–2005
Members of the Bundestag for the Christian Social Union in Bavaria